The Bugrinsky Bridge (Bugrinsky Most) is a road bridge over the Ob River in Novosibirsk, Russia.

The construction of the bridge began in February 2010 and finished in October 2014. It is the third automobile bridge over the Ob River in the city of Novosibirsk.

The former name "Olovozavodskoy" bridge was later changed to Bugrinsky because it crosses the Bugrinskaya grove on the left bank of the Ob, which is located next to one of the world's largest tin factory. Former city Mayor Vladimir Gorodetsky noted that the name "Olovozavodskoy" is two decades old and already outdated. On December, 3rd 2013 a commission decided unanimously to name the third bridge over the Ob River in Novosibirsk as "Bugrinsky". The bridge was opened on 8 October 2014 by President Vladimir Putin.

Gallery

References

External links
Video presentation of the bridge

Road bridges in Russia
B
Network arch bridges
Kirovsky District, Novosibirsk
Bridges over the Ob River
Bridges completed in 2014